Elke Cordelia Neidhardt AM (5 July 194125 November 2013) was a German Australian actress and opera and theatre director. She appeared in theatre, television and feature films in Germany, Austria, France and Australia, and directed operas in Zurich, Amsterdam, Aix-en-Provence, Salzburg, Vienna, Cologne and Australia.  She is best known in Australia for directing operas with Opera Australia, and most particularly for directing the first full modern Australian production of Richard Wagner's Ring Cycle, in Adelaide in 2004.

Career
Elke Neidhardt was born in Stuttgart.  She graduated from the State University of Music and Performing Arts Stuttgart, and later directed operas in Zurich, Amsterdam, Aix-en-Provence, Salzburg and Vienna.  Elke also made two films in Germany Der Schatten: Ein Märchen für Erwachsene (1963) and the Jerry Cotton thriller Mordnacht in Manhattan (1965).

She married an Australian and moved to Melbourne.  In 1967 she played Dr. Anna Steiner, a German doctor, in some episodes of the television series Skippy the Bush Kangaroo.  Neidhardt then appeared in other Australian television series such as The Link Men (1970) and Shannon's Mob (1975).  She was also in a small number of Australian feature films, including Libido (1973; in which she appeared nude), Alvin Purple (1973) and The True Story of Eskimo Nell (1975). Her last film was Inside Looking Out (1977).

From 1977 to 1990 Neidhardt was the resident director for Opera Australia.  She returned to Germany for six years, working at the Cologne State Opera and directing three productions of Richard Wagner's Ring Cycle.

In 2001 Neidhardt directed the first fully staged Australian production of Wagner's Parsifal, for the State Opera of South Australia. In 2004 she directed the first full modern Australian production of the Ring Cycle, in Adelaide, which attracted great praise.

Other operas she directed in Australia or overseas included Don Giovanni, Tosca, La traviata, Salome, Werther, Fidelio, Lohengrin, Andrea Chénier, The Flying Dutchman, I puritani, La finta semplice and Tannhäuser.  She also directed a touring production of Shakespeare's A Midsummer Night's Dream for the Bell Shakespeare Company.  She lectured at NIDA and the Sydney Conservatorium of Music. In 2006 she was a member of the judging panel for Operatunity Oz, along with Richard Gill, Yvonne Kenny and Antoinette Halloran.

Neidhardt had a reputation for clashing with the conductors she worked with.  She was also known for her bluntness and frankness, describing Australian culture as "quite massively behind"; criticising the prudishness of theatrical authorities about things such as nudity; regarding the Sydney Opera House as "awful to work in"; and criticising the decision not to repeat her 2004 Adelaide production of the Ring Cycle despite its overwhelming success.

Personal life
In 1967 Neidhardt married Christopher Muir, an Australian television director. They had a son, Fabian, before divorcing in 1977. Fabian Muir is now a Berlin-based photographer and writer.

Neidhardt had a 35-year relationship with Australian actor and musician Norman Kaye, nursing him through the final stages of Alzheimer's disease until his death in May 2007.  He had frequently proposed marriage to her, but she always declined, feeling that marriage was unnecessary.

Australian citizenship and honours 
Neidhardt became an Australian citizen in early 2007. She was appointed a Member of the Order of Australia (AM) in the Australia Day Honours 2011, "for service to the performing arts as an opera director and producer, and through the tuition and mentoring of young emerging artists".

Death
She died on 25 November 2013, aged 72. Her death occurred during Neil Armfield's new staging of the Ring Cycle in Melbourne.

References

External links

1941 births
2013 deaths
Australian film actresses
Australian television actresses
Australian theatre directors
German film actresses
German emigrants to Australia
German opera directors
Female opera directors
German stage actresses
German television actresses
German theatre directors
Helpmann Award winners
Members of the Order of Australia
Australian opera directors
Actresses from Stuttgart
State University of Music and Performing Arts Stuttgart alumni